Orleans (formerly New Orleans Bar and Orleans Bar) (Karuk: Panamnik), is an unincorporated community in Humboldt County, California. The ZIP Code is 95556. It is within the area code 530. It is within the historical territory of the Karuk Tribe of California.

The original indigenous settlement was named Panamnik.  When European-American miners arrived, they named their settlement New Orleans Bar.  It was renamed Orleans Bar in 1855 when it became the county seat of the now-defunct Klamath County, California. The Orleans post office was established on December 2, 1857.

Orleans is about 10 miles northeast of the site of the famous Patterson–Gimlin film of a purported Bigfoot.

Government

See also

Climate
Orleans has a Hot-summer Mediterranean climate (Csa) according to the Köppen climate classification system.

References

Settlements formerly in Klamath County, California
Former county seats in California
Unincorporated communities in Humboldt County, California
Unincorporated communities in California
1857 establishments in California